Annai College of Arts and Science is a college in Kovilacheri, Kumbakonam, Tamil Nadu, India. Which is affiliated to Bharathidasan University Trichirapalli.

See also
Education in India
Literacy in India
List of educational institutions in Tiruchirappalli
List of institutions of higher education in Tamil Nadu

References

External links

Colleges in Tamil Nadu
Education in Thanjavur district